The City of Winchester is a local government district in Hampshire, England, with a city status.

The 2011 Census recorded the population of the district as 116,600.

The district was formed on 1 April 1974, under the Local Government Act 1972, by the merger of the City of Winchester with Droxford Rural District and part of Winchester Rural District. It borders Basingstoke and Deane to the north, East Hampshire to the east, the Borough of Havant and the unitary authority area of Portsmouth to the south-east, the Borough of Fareham to the south, the Borough of Eastleigh to the south-west, and Test Valley to the west.

The city traces its history to the Roman Era, developing from the town of Venta Belgarum. It saw historic significance from its reconstruction under Alfred the Great in the 9th century, and grew in prominence until London replaced it as capital; Winchester saw a decline after plague swept the country, but began to recover from the 19th century.

Governance

Parliamentary constituencies 
The City of Winchester is made up of two parliamentary constituencies. Winchester constituency covers the north-eastern part of the city, as well as Chandler's Ford, which is part of Eastleigh. The remainder constitutes Meon Valley, which also covers part of East Hampshire and Havant. Winchester constituency has been represented by Steve Brine since 2010, whilst Meon Valley has been represented by Flick Drummond since the 2019 general election.

Winchester City Council 
Elections to the council are held in three out of every four years, with one third of the seats on the council being elected at each election. From 1995 to the 2004 election the Liberal Democrats had a majority on the council, but after 2 years when no party held a majority the 2006 election saw the Conservative party gain control. The elections on 6 May 2010 saw the Liberal Democrats re take control of the council, however the council soon switched to NOC a year later in 2011.  In 2012, the Conservative Party made their only Council gain of the entire English local elections and won a majority in Winchester once again. Subsequently, two Conservative councillors defected to the Liberal Democrat group, placing the council under No Overall Control. Following local elections on 7 May 2015, the Conservatives re-gained majority control of the council. Since the 2016 council election, in which new boundaries were introduced, no other parties than the Conservative and Liberal Democrats have held seats on the council. After the local elections on 2 May 2019, the Liberal Democrats gained majority control. Three independent councillors were elected as Conservatives. Cllr Weston resigned from the party in late 2019. Cllr Clementson was suspended from the party pending an investigation. Due to the COVID-19 pandemic, the scheduled 2020 local elections were postponed until 2021, when they took place alongside elections for Hampshire County Council. In November 2020 Alresford & Itchen Valley councillor Lisa Griffiths resigned from the Conservative Party to sit as an independent. In September 2020, Liberal Democrat Councillor Kim Gottlieb (who joined the party after leaving the Conservatives) resigned as a Councillor, leaving one of the three St Michael seats vacant. The vacancy was subsequently won in 2021 City Council election by the Liberal Democrats, who retained an overall majority on the council despite losing a seat to the Conservatives.

The council is currently led by a Liberal Democrat administration. The make up of the council as of February 2022 is:

 Liberal Democrats - 27
 Conservative Party - 15
 Independent - 2
 Green Party - 1

County Council 
Hampshire County Council holds elections every four years. Several Councillors are members of both the City and County Councils. In the 2021 elections the Winchester City district area elected seven representatives, out of 78:

Demographics 

A Legatum Prosperity Index published by the Legatum Institute in October 2016 showed the City of Winchester as the third most prosperous council area in the United Kingdom, after the Borough of Waverley and Mole Valley.

Ethnicity

Settlements and parishes

Settlements in the district include:
Abbotts Barton, Abbots Worthy, Avington
Badger Farm, Beauworth, Bighton, Bishops Sutton, Bishops Waltham, Boarhunt, Bramdean, Brockwood Park
Cheriton, Chilcomb, Colden Common, Compton and Shawford, Corhampton, Crawley, Curdridge
Denmead, Droxford, Durley
Easton, Exton
Hambledon, Headbourne Worthy, Hinton Ampner, Hursley
Itchen Abbas,  Itchen Stoke, Itchen Valley
Kilmeston, Kings Worthy
Littleton and Harestock
Martyr Worthy, Meonstoke, Micheldever, Morestead
New Alresford, Northington
Old Alresford, Olivers Battery, Otterbourne, Ovington, Owslebury
Shedfield, Soberton, Southwick, South Wonston, Sparsholt, Stoke Charity, Sutton Scotney, Swanmore
Tichborne, Twyford
Upham
Warnford, West Meon, Whiteley (part), Wickham, Widley, Winchester, Winnall, Wonston

Parishes

Notes

References

 

 
Non-metropolitan districts of Hampshire
Boroughs in England